Murari is a 2001 Indian Telugu-language supernatural family drama film written and directed by Krishna Vamsi. The film features Mahesh Babu in the title role along with Sonali Bendre, Lakshmi, Sukumari, Kaikala Satyanarayana, and Gollapudi Maruthi Rao. The film marks Bendre's Telugu debut. Mani Sharma composed the music, while Ram Prasad handled the cinematography. Peter Hein debuted as action choreographer with this film. The film marked the last on-screen appearance of veteran Telugu actor Dhulipala Seetarama Sastry.

The film revolves around the happy-go-lucky Murari whose Zamindar ancestors have been victims of Goddess Durga's generational curse since the mid-19th century. Every 48 years, the family's heirs lose their life in their early 30s due to this curse. No matter how many religious rituals are being performed since ages, the family loses its heirs. In this generation, Murari is the one to be succumbed by the curse. The film deals with Murari's redemption to overcome the curse through his spiritual will, and through his grandmother's self-sacrifice.

The film released on 17 February 2001 to positive reviews, was commercially successful and was declared a Super Hit at the box office. Murari has been dubbed into Hindi as Devta Ka Prit in 2015. It won three Nandi Awards including Second Best Feature Film. The film was remade in Kannada as Gopi (2006).

Synopsis
Due to a curse on a family, a family member gets killed every forty-eight years. At the beginning of another such cycle, when a young man's life is at stake, his grandmother makes a huge sacrifice to revoke the curse.

Plot
In nineteenth century, during the Amavasya phase, considered to be inauspicious, a greedy alcoholic Zamindar intrudes the temple to steal the idol of principal deity Durga, made of Panchaloha to repay the loans, he had borrowed from Britishers. Therefore, the divine powers kill the Britishers and Zamindar, conjuring a mythical curse on the Zamindar's family which results in the deaths of the family's heirs for every forty-eight years. 

In 2001, Murari is the motherless youngest child of the Zamindar's family, whose grandmother Sabari had lost her husband forty-eight years ago due to the curse, is concerned about the next victim of it. Murari, named after his late grandfather, receives utmost love and respect from his family comprising his father Sathipandu; Sabari; elder brothers Seenayya, Baachi and Soori; their wives and kids. Murari was raised and adored by his eldest sister-in-law Gopi, whom he admires. Murari's family is at odds with Gopi's maternal family headed by her uncle and foster father Chanti as the latter's alcoholic son Rambabu had created issues for them at Gopi's wedding. Therefore, Gopi is only allowed to visit her family alone and the others do not talk with her family. Vasundhara "Vasu" is Chanti's daughter who is a city-bred agricultural student. Murari perceives that Gopi had intentionally refused to have children as she feared that she might lose her affection for Murari if she had her own progeny, while the society kept humiliating her for being infertile. 

Creating a scenario, Murari accompanies Gopi to her village for her happiness, flirts with Vasu and falls in love with her. After a feud with Rambabu, Murari leaves to his house while leaving Gopi for a few days to complete the pending rituals of a Vratam. Meanwhile, Murari's family priest realizes that Murari would be the next victim of curse but hides it from Sabari. Vasu leaves to Hyderabad as she misses Murari. Upon Sathipandu's insistence, who knows about his feelings for Vasu, Murari goes to Hyderabad, confesses his feelings for Vasu, who unbeknownst to her family, comes to stay with Murari and family for a few days under pretext of a research as per Sathipandu's plan. Eventually, Murari convinces everyone to accept his relationship with Vasu. When he informs Sabari and requests her to accept his prospective marriage with Vasu, she is about to accept but the priest reveals about Murari's impending demise due to the curse and asks her to stop the marriage as Vasu would be widowed at a young age. Sabari obliges and objects to Vasu and Murari's marriage without revealing the truth.

Misinterpreting this last-minute decision of Sabari to be revenge for the family feud, Rambabu hastily arranges for Vasu to marry Bullabayi, a mute and greedy man. Sabari has Murari perform several rituals to get rid of the curse while Chanti arrives at the temple and informs everyone of Vasu's destined wedding. Murari decides to leave for rescuing her but Sabari stops him due to which the family confronts her and accuses her of avenging the feud between the families using Vasu. However, the priest bursts out the truth about the curse and Sabari's attempts to protect Murari from the curse and that her intention behind rejecting the wedding was to preserve Vasu's future from being spent as a widow. The family is shocked upon hearing this while Murari vows to return safe and leaves to bring Vasu, who escapes from the house with the help of her mother and other ladies. Murari saves Vasu when she is being chased by Bullabayi but gets stabbed by the latter. Hiding his wound and carrying an unconscious Vasu, Murari heads to the temple and proceeds to complete the pending ritual Abhishekam. 

Soori is notified of Murari's wound and fetches doctors without informing the family of it. Rambabu arrives and beats Murari with a stick while he is carrying the idol of Durga but the idol undergoes Rakthabhishekam, i.e, Abhishekam with blood. Vasu regains her consciousness and informs Gopi that Murari was stabbed. Murari completes the ritual and faints. However, as expected, Murari's condition doesn't stabilize fretting the family. To save Murari and to ensure his happiness, Sabari leaves to the river and drowns herself, giving herself as a sacrifice to satisfy the Goddess. As a result, the curse is nullified; Murari recovers. After a few days, Murari and Vasu get married and seek blessings from the Goddess and late Sabari's portrait.

Cast

 Mahesh Babu as Murari
 Sonali Bendre as Vasundhara, Murari's love interest 
 Lakshmi as Gopala Krishna Maheshwari aka Gopi, Murari's eldest sister-in-law and namesake mother
 Sukumari as Sabari, Murari's paternal grandmother
 Kaikala Satyanarayana as Sathipandu, Murari's father
 Gollapudi Maruthi Rao as Chanti, Vasu's father and Gopi's foster father
 Annapurna as Chanti's wife and Vasu's mother
 Sudha as Ammulu, Gopi and Vasu's cousin
 Prasad Babu as Seenayya, Murari's eldest brother and Gopi's husband 
 Sivaji Raja as Soori, Murari's third elder brother
 Anitha Chowdary as Soori's wife and Murari's third eldest sister-in-law
 Chinna as Baachi, Murari's second eldest brother
 Hema as Baachi's wife and Murari's second eldest sister-in-law
 Raghu Babu as Rambabu, Vasu's brother and Gopi's foster brother
 Ravi Babu as Bullabbayi, Vasu's fiancée 
 Chittajalu Lakshmipati as Vaali, Bullabbayi's sidekick
 Dhulipala as a Sage
 Prakash Raj as Zamindar, Murari's ancestor who tried to steal the idol of Durga
 M. S. Narayana as Zamindar's clerk who tried to stop him
 Naga Babu as Murari's ancestor
 Achyuth as Sabari's husband and Murari's paternal grandfather

Production

Development
When Krishna Vamsi visited a temple in a village, he came to know about a very famous person there whose three sons died under suspicious circumstances at regular intervals 4 years back. When he spoke to the local people, they said that the man killed a worker from lower cadre by hiring some goons and the wife of that murdered person came to this person's house and cursed that all his three sons would be dying within six months. After listening to them, he was intrigued by all these incidents. As a part of his research, he visited temples and observed the architecture, sculptures and also read books like Autobiography of a Yogi etc.

He said in an interview, "I met highly qualified people like Sirivennela Sitaramasastri to enhance my knowledge in various things. I also studied the visions of our ancestors, who during their time have designed things like missiles, television, aircrafts etc." He added, "We always have an answer for any questions that start with 'what', 'how' and 'when'. But we do not have any reason or answer for questions starting with 'why'. I had this kind of backdrop in my mind and wanted to make a film. When a film in the combination of Mahesh Babu and Krishna Vamsi was announced, I though I should make all those mystic questions get a representation in this film." He wanted to incorporate Telugu culture and tradition with a festive mood and thus used a joint-family backdrop.

Influenced by Hrishikesh Mukherjee's 1971 film Anand, Krishna Vamsi wanted to kill Mahesh Babu's character in this film as he felt that except Anand, no other film introduced a hero who would be dying very soon. During the story discussions, when he said the same to his team, none accepted. He aimed to go in reverse trend and form the film's screenplay as story writers used to create a problem and then introduced the hero to solve it in Telugu cinema. After meeting Mahesh Babu, Krishna Vamsi decided to use the story of Krishna for the family part. He clarified that it was not a true adaptation of Lord Krishna's life but he got inspired by the characterizations in Krishna's story.

According to Krishna Vamsi, the near-death situations Murari faces in the film are inspired from the attacks of rakshasas on Krishna and the fatal attack in the climax was inspired from Lord Krishna's death in the hands of a Yadava hunter. Sri Sita Ramachandra Swamy temple at Ammapally near Shamshabad was selected for filming key scenes related to the curse part of the story and the temple gained prominence after the film's release. A strong belief in the film industry emerged that a film with scenes shot at the temple will do well at the box-office.

Casting
Mahesh Babu acknowledged that this film was a crucial one in his career and noted in 2012 that the character of Murari was his favourite role. Sonali Bendre made her debut in Telugu with this film and it was her first collaboration with Krishna Vamsi. Lakshmi, Kaikala Satyanarayana, Prasad Babu, Gollapudi Maruthi Rao, Deekshitulu and Raghu Babu were a part of the film's principal cast. Ravi Babu played a negative role in the film. Actress Sukumari was selected to play the character of Sabari, Mahesh Babu's grandmother in the film which was one of her widely remembered role in Telugu cinema. Veteran film actor and religious guru Dhulipala Seetarama Sastry made a cameo appearance which was his last film. Prakash Raj played a cameo as the evil zamindar who was the first victim of the curse while Deekshitulu played the role of the temple's priest named Seshayya.

Characters
Regarding Mahesh's character in the film, Krishna Vamsi said, "During that time, I met Mahesh Babu a couple of times. He has a 'mugdha manohara mohana roopam' meaning that Mahesh has very beautiful look which can mesmerize anyone. I was impressed to such an extent that I wanted to add 'Krishna tatvam' to that film, as 'mugdha manohara mohana roopam' is the first quality of Lord Krishna. Just like the way Krishna had herd of cows, hero in this film had an animal (elephant). I wanted to create the atmosphere of Brundavanam. That's the reason why Mahesh is shown to be moving along with and surrounded by girls/women and kids."

Sonali Bendre's characterization in the first half was based on Satyabhama and her characterization in the second half was based on Rukmini. Because of that, Krishna Vamsi incorporated a scene similar to Rukmini Kalyanam (Lord Krishna takes Rukmini away from her place and marries her without the knowledge of her people) in the second half where Murari's character saves Vasundhara from her evil brother and takes away her from her village to marry her.

Lakshmi's character was based on Yasoda while Prasad Babu and Kaikala Satyanarayana's roles were partially inspired from Balarama's character. According to Krishna Vamsi, the other Yadavas in the film were the brothers and family members of hero while Ravi Babu's character was a mix of characterizations of Sisupala, Karna and Duryodhana. Two separated joint families like that of Pandavas and Kauravas were created though they are on good terms unlike the way portrayed in Lord Krishna's story.

Music

The songs and background score were composed by Mani Sharma. The album consisted of seven tracks. The soundtrack featured singers S. P. Balasubrahmanyam, K. S. Chitra, Jikki, Shankar Mahadevan, Udit Narayan, S. P. B. Charan, Sunitha, Anuradha Sriram and Harini. The lyrics were written by Veturi, Sirivennela Sitarama Sastry, Chandrabose and Suddala Ashok Teja.

Reception
The film received positive reviews. Idlebrain.com rated the film 3.5/5 stating, "The credit for the success or failure of this film should go to Krishna Vamsi. This film is bound get a little bit of dissent from the viewers of C class areas. But, this film is classic masterpiece for the class audience and highly recommended for the Mahesh and Krishnavamsi fans. This film will be a good fare for the people if they watch this film with no expectations. Just watch this film to experience Krishna Vamsi paint the silver screen with his classic strokes."

fullhyd.com rated the film 8/10 stating "Murari starts off on a good note with the desecration of the temple by Prakash Raj for money, and builds up an interesting story as to how three members of their family cursed by Devi Maa give up their lives. But the story soon loses its steam as we know for sure the sacrificial lamb. Murari is a typical Hum Aapke Hain Kaun kind of film with all the fun and laughter and the goodness among the people. It is good family movie with best cinematography and best performance by artists."

Awards
Nandi Awards - 2001
 Second Best Feature Film -  Silver - Gopi Nandigam and Ramalingeswara Rao
 Best Character Actress – Lakshmi
 Special Jury Award – Mahesh Babu

References

2001 films
2000s Telugu-language films
Indian supernatural films
Telugu films remade in other languages
Films directed by Krishna Vamsi
Films scored by Mani Sharma
Paranormal films
Supernatural fiction
Indian romantic drama films
Indian family films
2001 romantic drama films
2000s supernatural films
Films shot in Andhra Pradesh
Films set in Andhra Pradesh
Films set in Konaseema